Miss Mexico 2019 was the 3rd edition of the Miss Mexico pageant, held on Friday September 20, 2019 at the Desert of the Lions National Park in Cuajimalpa de Morelos, Mexico City, Mexico. The winner was Ashley Alvídrez Estrada of Chihuahua and she represented Mexico in Miss World 2019. Alvídrez Estrada was crowned by outgoing titleholder Vanessa Ponce de León, who is also Miss World 2018.

Final results

Placements

§ Winners of the Multimedia Challenge and Beauty with Purpose, and got a direct pass to the semifinals as a result.

Regional Queens of Beauty

Special Awards

Challenges

Beauty With a Purpose

Talent

Beach Beauty

Top Model

Sports

Dances of México

Multimedia

Judges

Final Judges
These are the members of the judges who evaluated the contestants during the finals:

 Jacqueline Aguilera - Miss World 1995 from Venezuela
 Mireia Lalaguna - Miss World 2015 from Spain
 Katherine González - Miss Teen International 1997
 Felicia Mercado - Miss Universe Mexico 1977
 Andrea Meza - Miss Mexico 2017 and Miss World Americas 2017
 Anabel Solis - Miss World Mexico 2010
 Leticia Murray - Miss Universe Mexico 2000
 Alfonso Waithsman - Makeup Artist and Imagine Advisor
 Cristina Cuellar - Image Director of Miss Mexico Organization
 Jouffroy Maldonado - Miss Mexico Official Dentist
 Arturo Gallo - Miss World Canada Communication and Media Advisor
 Juan Manuel Chaparro - Plastic Surgeon
 Oscar Madrazo - Fashion and Beauty Expert
 José Escobedo - Fan Representative Miss Mexico Organization

Preliminary Judges
These are the members of the preliminary judges, who chose the 16 semifinalists, after seeing the candidates in during private interview sessions and catwalk sessions in swimsuits and evening gowns:

 Jacqueline Aguilera - Miss World 1995 from Venezuela
 Mireia Lalaguna - Miss World 2015 from Spain
 Katherine González - Miss Teen International 1997
 Felicia Mercado - Miss Universe Mexico 1977
 Andrea Meza - Miss Mexico 2017 and Miss World Americas 2017
 Anabel Solis - Miss World Mexico 2010
 Leticia Murray - Miss Universe Mexico 2000
 Alfonso Waithsman - Makeup Artist and Imagine Advisor
 Cristina Cuellar - Image Director of Miss Mexico Organization
 Jouffroy Maldonado - Miss Mexico Official Dentist
 Arturo Gallo - Miss World Canada Communication and Media Advisor

Phase One Competition of Miss Mexico 2019

Phase 1 of Miss Mexico was held at the Hermanos Domínguez Theater in the city of San Cristóbal de Las Casas, Chiapas, Mexico, on Saturday, June 1, 2019, and was broadcast live through Channel 10 Chiapas, as well as on the official Facebook pages of the national and international organization. The winners were María Malo of Estado de México (State of Mexico) and Kenia Ponce of Baja California. Malo represented Mexico at Miss Grand International 2019 and Ponce represented the country at Miss United Continents 2019.

Placements

§ Voted by the public via internet to complete the table of 6 finalists.

Final Judges
 Dr. Juan Manuel Chaparro - Plastic Surgeon
 Ericka Cruz - Miss Universe Mexico 2002
 Dr. Nabani Matus - Aesthetic Surgeon
 Gerardo Murray - Vice President of Commercial Strategy for Latin America at IHG - Intercontinental Hotels Group
 Dr. Nestor Morales - Dentist and Smile Designer
 Rebeca Segura - Veracruzana writer and painter and Lady of the Chiapaneca Society
 Clara Sosa - Miss Grand International 2018

Contest Stages

Miss Multimedia

State Costume

Official Delegates

Contestants

Phase 1 Only Contestants
The following contestants only competed in Phase 1 of the competition:

Notes

Replacements
 - Kenia Pineda was stripped of her state title for breach of contract according to the Miss Colima State Organization and was replaced by Vanesa Hernández. However, Pineda reported physical and psychological abuse by Colima state coordinator Mike Vargas.
 - Naomi Rueda was originally appointed to represent Oaxaca in the national final. However, she resigned her title days before her coronation. Laura Mojica was appointed as a replacement.

References

External links
Official Website

2019 in Mexico
2019 beauty pageants
Beauty pageants in Mexico